The Standard was an Argentine newspaper based in Buenos Aires between 1861 and 1959. It claimed to be the first English daily in the Southern Hemisphere.

This newspaper was founded by the Irish brothers Edward and Michael Mulhall in 1861. Around 1900 their descendants succeeded them in leadership. It was the first in South America to use linotype machines. Alfredo Dougall, of Scottish origin would buy the newspaper in 1939. After going through various difficulties, the newspaper ceased operations in 1959.

Born as a weekly publication with the title "The Weekly Standard", its daily version appeared in December 1862 with the name "The Standard and River Plate News". After a while it would change to "The Standard". In 1943 it became "The Standard: (El Estandarte)".  From 1955, and until it ceased operations, it returned to its weekly frequency. The Max von Buch Library had archived editions of the newspaper, bound in 306 volumes, donated in 1999 by the children of Dougall.

History 

Edward Mulhall, born in Dublin in 1832, moved to Argentina where he was initially engaged in commercial sheep breeding in Ranchos and Zárate. In 1861, Edward joined his brother Michael to found an English-language newspaper for British immigrants living in Argentina. After accepting the offer, he sold all his assets to establish in the city.

First published as The Weekly Standard on May 1, 1861, the newspaper had a weekly frequency at the beginning, then switching to daily and/or weekly at the same time for different periods. Besides some changes in the title –"The Standard (and River Plate News)" since May 1862, and then simply "The Standard"– it claimed to be the first English-language daily newspaper in the southern hemisphere. It became the oldest and most respected English newspaper in South America. "'The Standard of Buenos Aires, long a principal source of Argentine business news, regularly shipped 20,000 copies of its monthly supplement to British investors". 

The Standard covered the first football match in Argentina, that took place on 20 June 1867 at the Buenos Aires Cricket Club Ground in Palermo, Buenos Aires.<ref>[https://www.rsssf.org/tablesa/arg-early-info.html "Early History of Football in Argentina'"] - RSSSF by Osvaldo J. Georgazzi, 1999</ref> The newspaper would also cover other football matches from then on, being considered a pioneer in sports coverage of Argentina.

By 1900, descendants of the Mulhall Brothers succeeded them as directors. In 1939, entrepreneur Alfredo Dougall (owner of Radio Excelsior), bought The Standard, which added a Spanish translation to its title since 1943. In December 1955, it became a weekly newspaper, until its definitive closure in 1959.

One of the Edward Mulhall's sons, Eduardo, was founder of another notable newspaper, La Argentina''.

A significant source on the history of Argentina, some numbers have been scanned and placed online (but without electronic searchability) by the University of San Andrés Argentina.

References

External links

 
 The Standard at the University of San Andrés

1861 establishments in Argentina
1959 disestablishments in Argentina
British Argentine
Defunct newspapers published in Argentina
English-language newspapers published in South America
Mass media in Buenos Aires
Newspapers established in 1861
Publications disestablished in 1959